The Woodstock Experience is a box consisting of a set of studio albums and live performances from the 1969 Woodstock Festival by the artists Santana, Janis Joplin, Sly and the Family Stone, Jefferson Airplane, and Johnny Winter.  Each set consists of the 1969 studio album by the artist as well as each artist's entire Woodstock performance. The set was released as both a box containing all five artists (10-CD box set), and also as individual releases separated by artist, each containing the studio album and live performance of that artist (2 CDs per artist).

Track listing

CD#1: Santana Studio
Santana, Santana's debut studio album.

CD#2: Santana Live
All songs by Santana Band except where noted
"Waiting" – 4:49
"Evil Ways" (Sonny Henry, Jimmy Zack) – 4:00
"You Just Don't Care" – 4:46
"Savor" – 5:23
"Jingo" (Babatunde Olatunji) – 5:31
"Persuasion" – 2:52
"Soul Sacrifice" – 11:35
"Fried Neckbones and Some Home Fries" (Willie Bobo, Melvin Lastie) – 6:41

CD#3: Janis Joplin Studio
I Got Dem Ol' Kozmic Blues Again Mama!, Janis Joplin's first solo studio album recorded after leaving her former band, Big Brother and the Holding Company.

CD#4: Janis Joplin Live
"Raise Your Hand" (Eddie Floyd, Steve Cropper, Alvertis Isbell) – 5:31
"As Good as You've Been to This World" (Nick Gravenites) – 6:25
"To Love Somebody" (Barry Gibb, Robin Gibb) – 5:16
"Summertime" (George Gershwin, Ira Gershwin, Dubose Heyward) – 5:05
"Try (Just a  Little Bit Harder)" (Jerry Ragovoy, Chip Taylor) – 5:13
"Kozmic Blues" (Janis Joplin, Gabriel Mekler) – 4:56
"Can't Turn You Loose" (Otis Redding) – 4:25
"Work Me, Lord" (Gravenites) – 8:42
"Piece of My Heart" (Ragovoy, Bert Berns) – 4:57
"Ball and Chain" (Big Mama Thornton) – 7:42

CD#5: Sly & the Family Stone Studio
Stand!, Sly & the Family Stone's fourth studio album.

CD#6: Sly & the Family Stone Live
All songs by Sylvester Stewart.
"M'Lady" – 7:46
"Sing a Simple Song" – 5:13
"You Can Make It If You Try" – 5:36
"Everyday People" – 3:15
"Dance to the Music" – 4:28
"Music Lover" / "Higher" – 7:50
"I Want to Take You Higher" – 6:43
"Love City" – 6:04
"Stand!" – 3:20

CD#7: Jefferson Airplane Studio
Volunteers, Jefferson Airplane's 1969 studio album.

CD#8: Jefferson Airplane Live
"Introduction" – 0:23
"The Other Side of This Life" (Fred Neil) – 8:18
"Somebody to Love" (Darby Slick) – 4:31
"3/5 of a Mile in 10 Seconds" (Marty Balin) – 5:30
"Won't You Try / Saturday Afternoon" (Paul Kantner) – 5:06
"Eskimo Blue Day" (Grace Slick, Kantner) – 6:55
"Plastic Fantastic Lover" (Balin) – 4:35
"Wooden Ships" (David Crosby, Kantner, Stephen Stills) – 21:25
"Uncle Sam Blues" (Traditional, arranged by Jorma Kaukonen, Jack Casady) – 6:12
"Volunteers" (Balin, Kantner) – 3:16
"The Ballad of You & Me & Pooneil" (Kantner) – 15:29
"Come Back Baby" (Traditional, arranged by Kaukonen) – 6:05
"White Rabbit" (G. Slick) – 2:27
"The House at Pooneil Corners" (Balin, Kantner) – 9:17

CD#9: Johnny Winter Studio
Johnny Winter, Johnny Winter's second studio album.

CD#10: Johnny Winter Live
"Mama, Talk to Your Daughter" (J. B. Lenoir) – 5:05
"Leland Mississippi Blues" (Johnny Winter) – 4:58
"Mean Town Blues" (Winter) – 10:54
"You Done Lost Your Good Thing Now" (B. B. King) – 14:45
"I Can't Stand It" (Bo Diddley) – 6:09
"Tobacco Road" (John D. Loudermilk) – 10:40
"Tell the Truth" (Lowman Pauling) – 6:51
"Johnny B. Goode" (Chuck Berry) – 5:36

Personnel

Santana
Carlos Santana – guitar, vocals
Gregg Rolie – keyboards, vocals
Dave Brown – bass
Mike Carabello – percussion
José "Chepitó" Areas – percussion, trumpet on "Fried Neckbones and Some Home Fries"
Michael Shrieve – drums

Janis Joplin
Janis Joplin – vocals
John Till – guitar
Richard Kermode – keyboards
Brad Campbell – bass
Maury Baker – drums
Terry Clements – tenor saxophone
Cornelius "Snooky" Flowers – baritone saxophone, vocals
Luis Gasca – trumpet

Sly & the Family Stone
Sly Stone – vocals, keyboards
Freddie Stone – guitar, vocals
Larry Graham – bass, vocals
Rose Stone – keyboards, vocals
Cynthia Robinson – trumpet, vocals
Jerry Martini – saxophone
Greg Errico – drums

Jefferson Airplane
Marty Balin – percussion, vocals
Grace Slick – vocals
Jorma Kaukonen – lead guitar, vocals
Paul Kantner – rhythm guitar, vocals
Jack Casady – bass
Spencer Dryden – drums
Nicky Hopkins – piano

Johnny Winter
Johnny Winter – guitar, vocals
Tommy Shannon – bass
Uncle John Turner – drums
Edgar Winter – keyboards, saxophone, vocals

References

Janis Joplin albums
Sly and the Family Stone albums
Johnny Winter albums
Jefferson Airplane live albums
Split albums
2009 live albums
Santana (band) live albums
Legacy Recordings live albums
2009 compilation albums
Legacy Recordings compilation albums
Albums produced by Bob Irwin
Woodstock Festival